William Lazenby (died c. 1888) was an English publisher of pornography active in the 1870s and 1880s. He used the aliases Duncan Cameron and Thomas Judd. His notable publications include magazines  The Pearl, which published poems thought to have been written by Algernon Charles Swinburne, The Oyster, The Boudoir and The Cremorne He also published such books as The Romance of Lust, Randiana, or Excitable Tales, The Birchen Bouquet (1881), The Romance of Chastisement (1883), The Pleasures of Cruelty (1886) and The Sins of the Cities of the Plain.  He was an associate of Edward Avery and Leonard Smithers. He was prosecuted in 1871 and again in 1881.

After the Post Office (Protection) Act 1884, Lazenby together with other publishers such as Edward Avery, Charles Carrington, and Harry Sidney Nichols, moved much of their business to Paris to sell in the United Kingdom by mail order.

References

 Patrick J. Kearney, A History of Erotic Literature (Macmillan, 1982), 
 Patrick J. Kearney and Gershon Legman, The Private Case: An Annotated Bibliography of the Private Case Erotica Collection in the British (Museum) Library (J. Landesman, 1981)
 Peter Mendes, Clandestine Erotic Fiction in English, 1800-1930: A Bibliographical Study (Scolar Press, 1993), 
 Lisa Z. Sigel, International Exposure: Perspectives on Modern European Pornography, 1800-2000 (Rutgers University Press, 2005), 

Year of birth missing
Year of death missing
Publishers (people) from London
English pornographers
1880s deaths